Fares Fares (born 29 April 1973) is a Swedish-Lebanese actor of Assyrian descent.

Early life 
Fares was born in Beirut, Lebanon. His younger brother is director Josef Fares, and he has four sisters. In 1987, when Fares was 14 years old, his family moved to Sweden, residing in Örebro. They moved to escape the Lebanese Civil War and chose Sweden because they had relatives who had already lived there. Fares says he learned Swedish within three months of living in Sweden.

From the age of 15, Fares acted in a local theater group in Örebro. When he was 19, he attended drama school in Mölnlycke near Gothenburg, Sweden. He spent six years working in the Theatre Tamauer.

Career

Film 
Fares has played major parts in his brother, director Josef Fares' films, including his debut acting performance in 2000's Jalla! Jalla! and 2003's Kopps. He starred in Bang Bang Orangutang (2005) and Kill Your Darlings (2006).

In 2010, Fares starred in the Swedish crime thriller Easy Money with Joel Kinnaman. The film was critically acclaimed and was picked up for American distribution by Harvey Weinstein. In 2012, Fares made his Hollywood debut in the Denzel Washington movie Safe House. He played CIA officer Hakim in Zero Dark Thirty. Fares had a role in Child 44 (2014) with Tom Hardy and Gary Oldman. Fares played Senator Vaspar in the Star Wars franchise movie Rogue One: A Star Wars Story (2016).

For 2013's Kvinden i buret (English title: The Keeper of Lost Causes), which was set in Denmark, Fares learned to speak Danish. Keeper of Lost Causes is based on a novel by Jussi Adler-Olsen, the first of four features based on his Department Q novels. Fares and Nikolaj Lie Kaas will appear in all four films. Keeper of Lost Causes was Denmark's top film of 2013. Fasandræberne (English title: The Absent One) is the second film in the series. It also broke Danish film grosses, setting new records. The third film in the series, A Conspiracy of Faith (Flaskepost fra P), premiered in Denmark in March 2016 and in the United States in June.

Television 
In 2014, Fares portrayed Fauzi Nadal in the TV show Tyrant on the FX Network. Tyrant was renewed for a second season, which began airing in the summer of 2015, and a third season in summer 2016. In 2018-2019 Fares appeared in the two HBO blockbuster series Westworld and Chernobyl. In 2021, he portrayed the Forsaken Ishamael in The Wheel of Time.

Theater 
 1996: Samuel Beckett's I väntan på Godot (Waiting for Godot) at Teater Tamauer, Sweden
 2000: Dom, directed by Jasenko Selimovic, with Torkel Petersson, at the Gothenburg City Theatre (Göteborgs Stadsteater), Gothenburg, Sweden
 2000: Natten före skogarna at Teater Tamauer, Sweden
 2001: Tillbaka till öknen at the Royal Dramatic Theatre, Stockholm, Sweden
 2002: Köket at the Gothenburg City Theatre, Gothenburg, Sweden
 2003: Brott, hemtjänst, straffpengar, pensionärsmord at Backstage, Sweden
 2003: Den arabiska natten at Backstage, Sweden

Other work 
 Fares appears in two music videos for Lykke Li; 2011 single, "I Follow Rivers", directed by Tarik Saleh and 2014 album teaser, "I Never Learn"
 Appeared in Daniel Lemma's music video "If I Used To Love You" with Torkel Pettterson
 2011: TV commercial for Tanqueray "Tonight We Tanqueray" - Actor - the bartender
 2012: Short film, sponsored by Maiyet called Sleepwalking In the Rift, directed by Cary Fukunaga
 2018: Plays Leo in the video game A Way Out
 2021: Did additional voices for It Takes Two.

Personal life 
Fares has stated that he spends time in Stockholm  and Los Angeles.

Filmography

References

External links 

1973 births
Living people
Assyrian emigrants to Sweden
Swedish male film actors
Swedish people of Assyrian/Syriac descent
Lebanese emigrants to Sweden
20th-century Swedish male actors
21st-century Swedish male actors
Swedish male television actors
Male actors from Beirut
Assyrian actors
Best Actor Guldbagge Award winners